Bonete is a municipality in Albacete, Castilla-La Mancha, Spain.

References

Municipalities of the Province of Albacete